Niort is a railway station in Niort, France. Niort is linked to Paris and towns and cities in the region:
Paris - La Rochelle (TGV Atlantique)
La Rochelle - Niort - Poitiers (TER)
Royan - Saintes - Niort (TER)

References

Railway stations in Nouvelle-Aquitaine
Buildings and structures in Deux-Sèvres
Railway stations in France opened in 1856